Melaleuca montana, commonly known as mountain bottlebrush, is a plant in the myrtle family, Myrtaceae and is endemic to the Border Ranges area of New South Wales and Queensland in Australia. (Some Australian state herbaria continue to use the name Callistemon montanus). It is a shrub or small tree distinguished from most other red bottlebrushes by its hairy petals.

Description
There is a mid-vein and 11 to 21 lateral veins.

The flowers are a shade of red to crimson and arranged in spikes on the sides of the branches. There are 27 to 47 stamens in each flower. Flowering occurs in spring and summer but sometimes at other times of the year.

Taxonomy and naming
Melaleuca montana was first formally described in 2006 by Lyndley Craven in Novon. The specific epithet (montana) is a Latin word  meaning "of mountains" in reference to the habitat of this species.

Callistemon montanus is regarded as a synonym of Melaleuca montana by the Royal Botanic Gardens, Kew,

Distribution and habitat
This melaleuca occurs in the Border Ranges area near the New South Wales–Queensland border. It grows in forest and heath in shallow soils on cliff tops and edges.

Use in horticulture
Melaleuca montana has long been in cultivation (as Callistemon montanus). Whilst the flowers may not be as attractive as those of Melaleuca citrina, it is more likely to flower in shady situations.

References

montana
Flora of New South Wales
Flora of Queensland
Plants described in 2006